Filip Novák (born May 7, 1982) is a Czech professional ice hockey player. Novak currently plays for Traktor Chelyabinsk in the Kontinental Hockey League (KHL). He has won the Gagarin Cup twice with Dynamo Moscow in 2012 and 2013.

Playing career
Novák played junior hockey with HC Budejovice in his native Czech Republic and with the Regina Pats of the Western Hockey League before he was drafted by the New York Rangers in the second round (64th overall) of the 2000 NHL Entry Draft.  After being drafted, he spent a two further seasons with Regina.

On March 8, 2002, he was part of a blockbuster trade that sent Novák, Igor Ulanov, a first-round selection in the 2002 NHL Entry Draft (later traded to Calgary Flames - Eric Nystrom), a second-round selection in the 2002 NHL Entry Draft (Rob Globke) and a fourth-round selection in the 2003 NHL Entry Draft to the Florida Panthers for Pavel Bure and a second-round selection in the 2002 NHL Entry Draft (Lee Falardeau). Nearing the end of the season, he sustained a serious injury that kept him off the ice until late 2004, when he played with the San Antonio Rampage of the American Hockey League.

Just prior to the start of the 2005–06 NHL season, Novák was traded to the Ottawa Senators for a sixth-round selection in the 2007 NHL Entry Draft. On August 8, 2006, Novák signed with the Columbus Blue Jackets as an unrestricted free agent.

On May 1, 2014, Novak was signed to a two-year contract extension to remain with Dynamo Moscow.

During his first season with HC Slovan Bratislava in 2015–16, Novak was traded after just 16 games with the club, remaining in the KHL with Russian club, Traktor Chelyabinsk on October 16, 2015.

Career statistics

Regular season and playoffs

International

Awards and honors

References

External links 
 

1982 births
Living people
Binghamton Senators players
Columbus Blue Jackets players
Czech expatriate ice hockey players in Canada
Czech expatriate ice hockey players in Russia
Czech expatriate ice hockey players in the United States
Czech ice hockey defencemen
Dinamo Riga players
Expatriate ice hockey players in Latvia
HC Dynamo Moscow players
HC MVD players
HC Slovan Bratislava players
Motor České Budějovice players
New York Rangers draft picks
Ottawa Senators players
Regina Pats players
San Antonio Rampage players
Sportspeople from České Budějovice
Syracuse Crunch players
Traktor Chelyabinsk players
Czech expatriate ice hockey players in Slovakia
Czech expatriate sportspeople in Latvia